Abbasabad-e Olya (also Romanized as ‘Abbāsābād-e ‘Olyā; also known as ‘Abbāsābād and ‘Abbāsābād-e Bālā) is a village in Abharrud Rural District, in the Central District of Abhar County, Zanjan Province, Iran. At the 2006 census, its population was 89, in 15 families.

References 

Populated places in Abhar County